Serra das Almas Private Natural Heritage Reserve is a private natural heritage reserve in the states of Ceará and Piauí, Brazil.

Origins

The reserve has its origins in a trip made by Herbert Fisk Johnson Jr. of S. C. Johnson & Son in September 1935.
He flew from Milwaukee, Wisconsin, to Fortaleza, Ceará, in an amphibious twin-engine Sikorsky S-38.
His aim was to learn more about the carnauba palm tree (Copernicia prunifera) of north eastern Brazil which produced wax, one of the main products of his company, and to determine whether groves of these trees could produce enough to meet future demand.
By 1937 the company had a carnauba processing factory in Fortaleza, and in 1938 had a research farm, later donated to the school of agronomy of the University of Ceara.
In 1960 the company created a Bazilian subsidiary in 1960, and in 1990 launched the environmental project that led to creation of the Serra das Almas Natural Reserve.

Location

Almost half of the reserve's original Caatinga vegetation had been devastated.
It is the property of the Caatinga Association (Associação Caatinga).
The reserve was gradually expanded through acquisition of adjacent lands.
The reserve now covers parts of the municipalities of Crateús, Ceará and Buriti dos Montes, Piauí.

Conservation

The reserve is supported by the Samuel Johnson Fund for Conservation of the Caatinga and the S. C. Johnson company. Through the Caatinga Association it has also received support from partners such as The Nature Conservancy, Petrobras, Fundação O Boticário, Fundo Nacional do Meio Ambiente and FUNBIO.
The November 2015 purchase was achieved through the support of the International Union for Conservation of Nature (IUCN).
The expansion, with monitoring, will help protect the reserve against indiscriminate hunting and fires.
The reserve planned to expand biodiversity monitoring, surveillance and scientific research, and also to expand environmental education and ecotourism.

The main threat is illegal hunting of the rich fauna of the reserve.
The deer, peccary, armadillo, agouti and rock cavy are under constant threat from hunters.
The Saffron finch is much sought after by live bird traffickers.
Other birds on the endangered list are the Blue-fronted amazon and the guan.

Notes

Sources

2000 establishments in Brazil
Protected areas of Ceará
Protected areas of Piauí
Private natural heritage reserves of Brazil